Open House Melbourne (OHM) is an event held in Melbourne, Victoria, Australia that showcases many of the city's buildings to the public. This annual event is held on the last weekend in July since 2008.

Open House Melbourne is also a not-for-profit association that runs the Open House Weekend, as well as an annual program of events, providing the public a free and rare opportunity to discover a hidden wealth of architectural, engineering and historic buildings nestled around the city. Residents, visitors, families, design buffs, and architecture fans can explore great contemporary, historic and sustainable buildings and spaces located in and around the Melbourne City Centre, Carlton, East Melbourne, Southbank and Docklands. Well known buildings not usually open to the public are open for free public tours. Among the buildings included are historical landmarks, contemporary buildings, galleries, theatres, sporting grounds and places of worship.

The inaugural Open House Melbourne 2008 event saw 8 buildings open and more than 30,000 visits across the day. Since then, the event has grown and the 2010 event expanded to 59 buildings, incorporating Docklands in addition to Melbourne’s CBD, and attracted almost 65,000 visitors.

In the 2011 event 75 buildings opened their doors and attracted 100,000
visitors.

For its fifth year, the 2012 event featured 100 buildings and attracted 135,000
visitors.

In the 2013 event 111 buildings opened over the weekend and attracted 130,000 visitors.

The 2016 event featured over 100 buildings.

The 2019 event featured over 200 buildings and 45 special events, tours and talks.

Open House Melbourne is an initiative of the Committee for Melbourne Future Focus Group. In 2017 Open House Melbourne held the Open House Ballarat Weekend, the first regional program run by Open House Melbourne, in partnership with City of Ballarat and Visit Ballarat. In 2018 and 2019 the organisation also held Open House Bendigo in partnership with The City of Greater Bendigo.

Shortlist of participating buildings
Argus Building
Arts Centre Melbourne 
Australian Tapestry Workshop
Collingwood Town Hall
Como House
Coop's Shot Tower
Council House 2
Edgewater Towers
Federation Square
Government House
Hamer Hall
Hawthorn tram depot
Hellenic Museum
Hotel Windsor
La Trobe's Cottage
Luna Park
Malthouse Theatre
Malvern Town Hall
Melbourne Athenaeum
Melbourne Central Shopping Centre
Melbourne City Baths
Melbourne Convention and Exhibition Centre
Melbourne General Cemetery
Melbourne Observatory
Melbourne Recital Centre
Melbourne Town Hall
National Gallery of Victoria
Old Treasury Building, Melbourne
Palais Theatre
Parliament House
Prahran Town Hall
Prima Tower
Princes Pier
Public Record Office Victoria
RMIT Storey Hall
RMIT Swanston Academic Building
Rod Laver Arena
Royal Children's Hospital, Melbourne
Shrine of Remembrance
Sidney Myer Music Bowl
South Melbourne Town Hall
St Paul's Cathedral, Melbourne
State Library of Victoria
Supreme Court of Victoria
Rialto Towers
University of Melbourne
Victoria Barracks
Victorian Trades Hall
Young and Jackson Hotel

See also
Brisbane Open House
Doors Open Days
Heritage Open Days
Doors Open Canada
Open House London
Open House New York
Open House Chicago

References

External links
Open House Melbourne Homepage

Melbourne
Culture of Melbourne
Annual events in Australia
Recurring events established in 2008
Winter events in Australia
2008 establishments in Australia